Guillaume Belin (? - 1568) was a French Renaissance singer and composer.  His known compositions of chansons date to about 1539.  Pieces by Belin were included in two of the volumes of "New Songs with Four Parts" published in 1543 and 1544 in Paris by Pierre Affeingnant and Hubert Jullet.  He is known to have been employed as a singer at the Chapelle royale circa 1547. He was later at the Sainte-Chapelle where he set music to "Hymns of the Bible" in French.  He died the year 1568.

References

1568 deaths
16th-century French composers
French male singers